This is a list of cricketers who played first-class or List A matches for Sheikhupura cricket team in Pakistan.

Aaqib Javed
Abdul Haseeb
Ahmed Saleem
Ahsan Virk
Ali Raza
Asif Raza
Faisal Rasheed
Faisal Virk
Farrukh Majeed
Humayun Ali
Humayun Shaukat
Imran Nazir
Irfan Ashraf
Irfan Imtiaz
Jaffar Nazir
Javed Hussain
Kaleem Imran
Kaleemullah
Kashif Imran
Kashif Raza
Khalil Ahmed
Majid Majeed
Maqsood Raza
Mohammad Arslan
Mohammad Asif
Mohammad Ayub
Mohammad Azam
Mohammad Haroon
Mohammad Hasan
Mohammad Ishaq
Mohammad Islam
Mohammad Javed
Mohammad Naeem
Mohammad Sarwar
Mohammad Shafiq
Mohammad Shehbaz
Mohammad Usman
Mohammad Yasin
Mubarak Ali
Mujahid Jamshed
Mumtaz Ali
Mushtaq Nazir
Nadeem Iqbal
Nadeem Javed
Nadeem Karamat
Nasim Abbas
Naved-ul-Hasan
Nawaz Sardar
Qaiser Abbas
Qamar Abbas
Rashid Khan
Sajjad Ali
Sajjad Khan
Saleem Mughal
Sarfraz Kazmi
Shahid Naseer
Shakeel Ahmed
Sohail Shehzad
Tahir Amin
Tahir Usman
Umar Saleem
Usman Akram
Usman Azam
Waqar Khan
Waqas Chughtai
Yasir Bashir
Zahid Javed
Zakaullah Khan
Zubair Watto

References

Sheikhupura cricketers